Ula Tirso (in Sardinian language just Ula) is a comune (municipality) in the Province of Oristano in the Italian region Sardinia, located about  north of Cagliari and about  northeast of Oristano.

Ula Tirso borders the following municipalities: Ardauli, Busachi, Ghilarza, Neoneli, Ortueri.

Demographic evolution

References

Cities and towns in Sardinia